Water polo was contested for men only at the 1971 Pan American Games in Cali, Colombia.

Competing teams
Six teams contested the event.

Medalists

References

 Pan American Games water polo medalists on HickokSports

1971
1971 Pan American Games
1971
1971 in water polo